Matthew Brwmffild (fl. 1525–1545) was a Welsh poet. He is believed to have been from the Maelor area.

Around 1520 he wrote a number of poems in praise of Rhisiart ap Rhys ap Dafydd Llwyd, of Gogerddan, and in 1539, of Rhys ap Howel of Porthamyl, Anglesey. His other subjects include Lewis Gwynn (died c.1552), and Siôn Wynn ap Meredith of Gwydyr (died c. 1559). 
 The Oxford Dictionary of National Biography reports that about twenty poems by him are recorded.

References 

Year of birth missing
Year of death missing
16th-century Welsh poets